Tornado is a video game for the Nintendo DS handheld gaming system, developed by South Korean studio SKONEC Entertainment and published by Ignition Entertainment. The game tasks you as Toki, a member of the Cosmic Cleaner, who must replace all of Earth's items which have been stolen by a character known only as the "Prince". Players do this by following him to Planet 69 and using a "tornado machine" to uproot all the items that the prince has stolen. The game makes use of both the stylus and microphone of the DS system.

Reception 

The game received "generally unfavorable reviews" according to the review aggregation website Metacritic.

See also
Tornado Outbreak, a similarly-themed video game released on contemporary consoles

References

External links 
 

2008 video games
Action video games
Cancelled PlayStation Portable games
Nintendo DS games
Nintendo DS-only games
Video games developed in South Korea
UTV Ignition Games games
Single-player video games